Mystery Ranch is a 1934 American comedy Western film co-produced and directed by Bernard B. Ray and starring Tom Tyler, Roberta Gale and Jack Perrin. It was Tyler's first of 18 films for Reliable Pictures.

Plot
Pulp Western writer Bob Morris is invited to a dude ranch whose owner Mrs. Henderson promises will feature the "real" dangerous Wild West. In reality Mrs. Henderson arranges a variety of fake lynchings, cattle rustling and dangerous situations to frighten Mr. Morris and gain publicity for her ranch. The joke backfires because Morris is a skilled horseman and expert fighter who impresses Mrs. Henderson and her daughter Mary.

Morris and his secretary Percy Jenkins view an automobile hold up that they believe is another of Mrs. Henderson's tricks. In reality it is an actual holdup of gold bullion with the robbers coming to Mrs. Henderson's ranch.

Cast
 Tom Tyler as Bob Morris  
 Roberta Gale as Mary Henderson  
 Louise Cabo as Mrs. Henderson  
 Jack Perrin(billed as Jack Gable) as George Andrews 
 Frank Hall Crane as Percy Jenkins  
 Charles King as Sam  
 Tom London as Holdup Man  
 George Chesebro as Holdup Man  
 Lafe McKee as Sheriff

References

Bibliography
 Pitts, Michael R. Poverty Row Studios, 1929–1940: An Illustrated History of 55 Independent Film Companies, with a Filmography for Each. McFarland & Company, 2005.

External links
 

1934 films
1934 comedy films
1930s Western (genre) comedy films
American Western (genre) comedy films
American black-and-white films
Films about writers
Films directed by Bernard B. Ray
Reliable Pictures films
1930s English-language films
1930s American films